Narcomedusae is an order of hydrozoans in the subclass Trachylinae. Members of this order do not normally have a polyp stage. The medusa has a dome-shaped bell with thin sides. The tentacles are attached above the lobed margin of the bell with usually a gastric pouch above each. There are no bulbs on the tentacles and no radial canals. Narcomedusans are mostly inhabitants of the open sea and deep waters. They can be found in the Mediterranean in large numbers.

Feeding Behavior
Narcomedusae use their tentacles to catch large, fast-moving prey.  They do this by holding their tentacles perpendicular to the direction they are swimming to cover a larger area.  If something is caught they bend the tentacle inwards and coil them at the tips to their mouths.

Reproductive Features 
Narcomedusae hermaphroditic, meaning that they have both male and female reproductive organs. As a result they release their eggs and sperm into the water which is also where fertilization happens. Once the eggs are fertilized they then develop into a stage called planula  which can be defined as a larval stage and it then lives in the seafloor. These jellyfish are capable of reproducing all year round, although this depends on their reproductive cycle and patterns as they fluctuate depending on factors such as environmental conditions and food availability.

References

Gallery

 
Cnidarian orders
Trachylinae
Taxa named by Ernst Haeckel